Los Muermos is a city and commune in Llanquihue Province, Los Lagos Region in southern Chile.

Demographics
Of these, 5,707 (33.6%) lived in urban areas and 11,257 (66.4%) in rural areas. The population fell by 0.5% (90 persons) between the 1992 and 2002 censuses.

Climate
The climate in this area has mild differences  between highs and lows, and there is adequate rainfall year-round.  According to the Köppen Climate Classification system, Los Muermos has a marine west coast climate, abbreviated "Cfb" on climate maps.

Administration
As a commune, Los Muermos is a third-level administrative division of Chile administered by a municipal council, headed by an alcalde who is directly elected every four years. The 2008-2012 alcalde is Emilio González Burgos (UDI).

Within the electoral divisions of Chile, Los Muermos is represented in the Chamber of Deputies by Fidel Espinoza (PS) and Carlos Recondo (UDI) as part of the 56th electoral district, together with Puyehue, Río Negro, Purranque, Puerto Octay, Fresia, Frutillar, Llanquihue and Puerto Varas. The commune is represented in the Senate by Camilo Escalona Medina (PS) and Carlos Kuschel Silva (RN) as part of the 17th senatorial constituency (Los Lagos Region).

References

External links
  Municipality of Los Muermos

Communes of Chile
Populated places in Llanquihue Province